The 2009–10 season was Portsmouth's 111th in existence, their seventh season in the Premier League and their seventh consecutive season in the top division of English football. It was a season in which the club struggled with financial problems and entered administration.

The club finished at 20th place in the league, a place they had occupied since the second matchday, which meant relegation to the Championship. Portsmouth managed to only receive points in 14 of the 38 games, including only seven wins. In March they were docked nine points for entering administration.

Portsmouth's biggest success in the season came in the FA Cup, advancing to the final after beating Coventry City, Sunderland, Southampton, Birmingham City and Tottenham Hotspur. They played at Wembley Stadium in the final against Chelsea, a game that Chelsea won by 1–0. Portsmouth also participated in the League Cup and reached the quarter-finals.

Manager Paul Hart was sacked in November and replaced by Avram Grant, who stayed until the end of the season. French striker Frédéric Piquionne scored eleven goals throughout the season and was the club's top goalscorer.

Team kit
The team kit was produced by Canterbury of New Zealand and the shirt sponsor was Jobsite. On 8 April, Portsmouth announced a new five-year kit supply deal with Kappa. They wore the Kappa strip for the first time in the FA Cup semi-final on 11 April.

Ownership changes
The club started the season with great expectation after Sulaiman Al-Fahim bought the club from previous owner Alexandre Gaydamak for a fee around £60 million, but Al-Fahim's ownership only lasted 40 days until Ali Al-Faraj and his business Falcondrone Ltd. bought 90% of Al-Fahim's stake in Portsmouth; as part of the deal, Al-Fahim became non-executive chairman at the club until the end of the 2010–11 season.
However, at the start of February 2010, al-Faraj lost his stake in Portsmouth to a debtor as part of a repayment agreement on one of his loans.
In 2010, Balram Chainrai loaned former owner Ali al-Faraj £17 million, secured through collateral of Fratton Park grounds and the club itself. When the owner failed to pay meet a scheduled loan repayment, Chainrai took over control of the club. He intended to sell the club as soon as possible, and in the meantime he leased Fratton Park back to Portsmouth, with possible future rental yields of nearly a million pounds annually. On the morning of 26 February, a formal announcement was made that the club had entered administration and would be docked 9 points once three directors of the Premier League board had met to agree when the points should formally be taken. Andrew Andronikou, Peter Kubik and Michael Kiely of accountancy firm UHY Hacker Young were appointed by the club as administrators.

Financial problems
Even before the season began Portsmouth saw a net transfer spend in the far negative, with key players such as Glen Johnson, Peter Crouch, Niko Kranjčar, and Sylvain Distin all departing the club. Although a team was assembled through cheap deals and loans, it soon became clear that Portsmouth had been depleted of quality and the team began sliding down to the bottom of the table, with the first seven league matches all being lost.

As the season progressed, the finances dried up and the club admitted on 1 October that some of their players and staff had not been paid. On 3 October, media outlets started to report that a deal was nearing completion for Ali al-Faraj to take control of the club. On Monday 5 October, a deal was agreed for Al Faraj and his associates via the British Virgin Islands-registered company Falcondrone to hold a 90% majority holding, with Al-Fahim retaining 10% stake and the title of non-executive chairman for two years. Falcondrone also agreed a deal with Gaydamak the right to buy, for £1, Miland Development (2004) Ltd, which owned various strategic pockets of land around the ground, once refinancing was complete. 2 days after the Al-Faraj takeover was completed, Portsmouth's former technical director Avram Grant returned as director of football.

On the pitch, Portsmouth's late transfer of funds called for a flurry of transfers at the end of the window, including the loan signing of Ivorian international Aruna Dindane, who would go on to score a hat-trick against Wigan Athletic. An opening run of seven defeats raised fears Hart would be sacked, but at the eighth attempt, at Molineux, Hassan Yebda (another loanee) headed in to secure the first win. Portsmouth were beaten 4–2 at Fratton Park by Aston Villa in the quarter finals of the League Cup, having beaten off Premiership high-flyers Stoke City; yet another loanee, Frédéric Piquionne, was on target twice. However, because of the financial problems, the Premier League placed the club under a transfer embargo, meaning the club were not allowed to sign any players.

Paul Hart was sacked by the board on 24 November, based on the poor results that left Portsmouth at the bottom of the league. He was offered the role of technical director responsible for players aged 18–21, but he declined. Coaches Paul Groves and Ian Woan took temporary charge of the team. On 26 November 2009, Portsmouth F.C. announced on its official website that Avram Grant had been appointed as manager.

On 3 December, it was announced that the club had failed to pay the players for the second consecutive month. On the 31st, it was announced player's wages would again be paid late, on 5 January 2010. According to common football contracts, the players then had the right to terminate their contracts and leave the club without any compensation for the club, upon giving 14 days notice. Despite the financial difficulties, Grant's time as manager was initially successful, having won two of his first four games in charge (against Sunderland and Liverpool) and only narrowly missing out on a point against league leaders Chelsea.

HM Revenue and Customs (HMRC) filed a winding-up petition against Portsmouth at the High Court in London on 23 December. HMRC claimed the club owed large sums in unpaid VAT on the club's net receipts from its negative transfer spend over the previous two years. Initially, the club denied the winding-up order and a statement was released via the club's website, in which the club stated that they expected the winding-up order to be retracted. The club applied to the High Court to strike out the winding-up petition. Tax lawyer Conrad McDonnell argued that the standard VAT treatment of football clubs, negotiated between the FA and HMRC, was wrong and legally no VAT should be charged on transfers of employees (players are employees), so that the whole HMRC debt was disputed. On 19 January 2010, the High Court dismissed the club's claim, although permission to appeal was granted and a statement from Portsmouth said the judge "considered an appeal to the Court of Appeal would have a 'real chance of success'".  This meant that the case stayed open and HMRC were not able to proceed with an immediate winding-up as they wanted.

Meanwhile, it was announced on 5 January that the Premier League were to use Portsmouth's share of the latest installment of television broadcast monies to pay off the club's debts to other top-flight sides. Chelsea, Tottenham and Watford were all owed money by Portsmouth (as were Udinese and Lens). The Premier League split £7 million between them. The action is allowed within league rules to protect clubs that are owed money from transfers.

On 26 January, the Premier League partially lifted the transfer embargo, and allowed the club to sign and register loanees and players not registered to other clubs. Portsmouth managed to sell a few players, raising hope that bills and staff might get paid on time. On 28 January, the club's deep financial trouble was further highlighted by the temporary closure of the Portsmouth website, after the club failed to pay their bills for its upkeep to their Bournemouth-based digital agency Juicy. The website was back live several hours later, after Juicy announced a new financial arrangement with Portsmouth. It appeared on 2 February that staff and players were not paid their wages on time for the fourth time in five months, causing Portsmouth's PFA representative to call for more openness from within the club.

On 4 February, Portsmouth was taken over by its fourth owner in one season: Balram Chainrai. A Nepalese businessman based in Hong Kong, Chainrai took over Portsmouth as part of a clause in a loan deal he made with the previous owners. He is thought to have given the club between £15 and £20 million, but the debts were not repaid.

A full court hearing of HMRC's winding-up petition was held on 10 February and the club was given a "stay-of-execution" for a further seven days with a view to securing a new buyer. If the club did not enter administration or HMRC did not recover its money, the club could have been wound up by the Court and a liquidator appointed.

On 26 February, having not secured a new buyer before the 25 February deadline, Portsmouth prepared to enter administration, and appointed UHY Hacker Young as administrators. On the morning of 26 February, a formal announcement was made that the club had entered administration and would be docked nine points once three directors of the Premier League board had met to agree when the points should formally be taken. The Premier League decided to delay their decision until the court case on 15 March decided the club's fate. After beating Birmingham City 2–0 on 6 March, Portsmouth qualified for the FA Cup semi-final, to face Tottenham Hotspur at Wembley on 11 April. On 11 March, the HMRC withdrew their winding-up order, having contested the validity of the administration that was implemented on 26 February, after receiving documentation proving its validity. On 12 March Peter Storrie stepped down as the club's CEO, though he remained at the club in the short term as a consultant to the administrator.

On 15 March, a consortium fronted by Rob Lloyd entered a period of exclusivity to buy Portsmouth. Rob Lloyd met 19 invited Portsmouth fans at the Hilton Portsmouth on Sunday 14th to outline his group's plans and to answer questions from the fans.

On 17 March, Portsmouth were docked nine points for entering administration. That only confirmed a relegation that was always inevitable, with Portsmouth being last in the league on actual points as well. Portsmouth reached the 2010 FA Cup Final against Chelsea, losing the match 1–0, but would have normally been qualified to the UEFA Europa League as Chelsea had qualified for the higher ranked Champions League. However, Portsmouth was denied entry due to its financial state, with Premier League's 7th-placed team Liverpool taking over its place.

On 24 March, administrator Andrew Andronikou revealed that the club would be looking to start the next season with a whole new squad. Players with expiring contracts would be allowed to leave and Portsmouth were looking to sell between eight and ten players. Overall, up to 20 players could leave at the end of the season. The club would be looking to build their team from free transfers in the summer transfer window to save money.

Players

First-team squad
Squad at end of season

Left club during season

Statistics

Appearances and goals

Top scorers

Transfers

In
Permanent

Loan

Out
Permanent

Loan

Matches

Pre-season

Competitions

Premier League

Results by round

Final league table

Notes

References

 http://soccernet.espn.go.com/news/story?id=746923&sec=england&cc=3888&ghg

External links
Official Website

Portsmouth F.C. season 2009–10 at ESPN

Portsmouth
Portsmouth F.C. seasons